= Alpha Butte =

Mountain in Nevada, United States

Coordinates: 40°52′06″N 118°10′41″W

Alpha Butte is a summit in the U.S. state of Nevada. The elevation is 5,715 feet (1,742 m).

Alpha Butte was named from its location as first in a series of hills.
